Cheraghu (also Romanized as Cherāghū) is a village in Siyah Banuiyeh Rural District, in the Central District of Rabor County, Kerman Province, Iran. At the 2006 census, its population was 19, in 5 families.

References 

Populated places in Rabor County